Haplochromis omnicaeruleus is a species of cichlid endemic to Lake Victoria where it is known from the southeastern portion of the lake.  This species can reach a length of  SL.

References

omnicaeruleus
Fish of Tanzania
Fish of Lake Victoria
Fish described in 1998
Taxonomy articles created by Polbot